Reynold is an English masculine given name come from an Old High German personal name made up of the element "ragin" (advice, decision) and "wald" (power, authority, brightness). It is a cognate of Rögnvaldr, which is also a source of the name Ronald. The Normans brought the name to England. Related names include: "Reginald" (English), "Reginaldo" (Italian),  "Rinaldo" (Italian), "Reinaldo" (Portuguese, Spanish), "Reinhold" (German), "Reino" (Finnish), "Reynol" (German, Spanish), "Reinout" (Dutch), "Renaud" (French), "Reynaldo" (Spanish), and "Reynaud" (French). Reynold is a much less common surname than its derivative Reynolds; people with the surname "Reynold" include:

Surname
 Hannah Reynold, Swedish singer with Lucky Twice

References

English masculine given names
Given names
English given names
Masculine given names